Devi Bux Singh (born 14 May 1940) is an Indian politician. He is a former member of the Lok Sabha for three consecutive terms. He is associated with the Bharatiya Janata Party since 1989.

References

India MPs 1998–1999
Living people
1940 births
People from Unnao district
Lok Sabha members from Uttar Pradesh
Bharatiya Janata Party politicians from Uttar Pradesh
India MPs 1991–1996
India MPs 1996–1997